Płoskinia  is a village in Braniewo County, Warmian-Masurian Voivodeship, a part of northern Poland. It is the seat of the Gmina (administrative district) called Gmina Płoskinia.

The village has a population of 460.

References

Villages in Braniewo County